The MAX Orange Line is a light rail service in Portland, Oregon, United States, operated by TriMet as part of the MAX Light Rail system. It connects Portland City Center, Portland State University (PSU), Southeast Portland, Milwaukie, and Oak Grove. It averaged 3,480 daily weekday riders in September 2020.

The Orange Line starts near Portland Union Station on north end of the Portland Transit Mall in downtown Portland. Within the transit mall, it operates as a southbound through service of the Yellow Line from Union Station/Northwest 5th & Glisan station on 5th Avenue and shares the tracks with the Green Line. Northbound, the Orange Line operates through to the Yellow Line at PSU South/Southwest 6th and College station on 6th Avenue and terminates at Expo Center station in North Portland. South of the transit mall, it continues along a  segment through the South Waterfront, across the Willamette River into Southeast Portland, then south to Oak Grove, just outside Milwaukie proper in unincorporated Clackamas County.

The Portland–Milwaukie Light Rail Project began construction in 2011 after decades of failed light rail plans for the Portland–Milwaukie (McLoughlin Boulevard) corridor. The extension was the second and final phase of the South Corridor Transportation Project, which in its first phase expanded light rail to Interstate 205 (I-205) and the Portland Transit Mall.  As part of the project, TriMet built Tilikum Crossing over the Willamette River, the largest "car-free" bridge in the United States. The extension was inaugurated by Orange Line service on September 12, 2015.

History

Early proposals to Clackamas County

In 1975, a task force of Governor Tom McCall and the Columbia Region Association of Governments (CRAG) proposed a network of "transitways" between Portland and its suburbs following calls to transfer federal assistance funds from the canceled Mount Hood Freeway project to other transportation projects in the region. The proposal primarily envisioned a busway concept, but also considered a light rail alternative, particularly for the corridor between Portland and Oregon City in Clackamas County. Amid pressure to identify a use for the transfer money, as stipulated by a provision in the Federal Aid Highway Act of 1973, CRAG prioritized redeveloping the Banfield Transitway, a segment of I-84 connecting I-5 in downtown Portland east to I-205, and put the Oregon City corridor on hold. In November of that year, regional transit agency TriMet lost its option to purchase used PCC streetcars from Toronto, which it had hoped to use on the proposed Portland–Oregon City line, after the Toronto Transit Commission declined to renew TriMet's hold. The Banfield Transitway received the transfer funds, and despite efforts from the Oregon Department of Transportation to build a busway, a light rail line was built. The first segment of the Metropolitan Area Express (MAX) opened between Gresham and Portland on September 5, 1986.

Several months before the inauguration of MAX, Metro, which replaced CRAG in 1979, revisited light rail plans for the Oregon City corridor via McLoughlin Boulevard, as well as proposed converting the partially realized I-205 busway into another light rail line. By that time, however, TriMet had already begun planning for the formally designated "Westside Corridor" in Washington County. Noting that federal funds could only be spent on one project at a time, Metro's Joint Policy Advisory Committee on Transportation (JPACT) made the I-205 corridor their next priority after the Westside project and the McLoughlin Boulevard corridor third priority. Clackamas County officials went on to dispute the federal money, including $17 million in excess funds that had been allocated to the I-205 busway. To settle the issue, Metro released a regional transportation plan (RTP) that reasserted the Westside Corridor's priority in January 1989.

Failed South/North line

Despite priority given to the Westside Corridor, Metro's RTP commissioned studies for the I-205 and McLoughlin Boulevard corridors. In September 1989, U.S. Senators and members of the Senate Committee on Appropriations Mark Hatfield of Oregon and Brock Adams of Washington secured $2 million from the federal government to assess both segments. At the request of the senators, a segment farther north to Vancouver and Clark County in Washington became part of the proposals. As the studies analyzed alternative routes, the project's advisory committee increasingly favored an alignment closer to downtown Portland along the busier I-5 and Willamette River corridors. In 1994, Metro finalized a  light rail route from Hazel Dell, Washington through downtown Portland to Clackamas Town Center, which TriMet formally called the "South/North Corridor".

In November that year, Metro asked Oregon voters in the Portland metropolitan area if they would authorize a $475 million bond measure, which would provide funding for Oregon's share of the project's estimated $2.8 billion cost. Nearly two-thirds of the voters said yes. To fund Washington's $237.5 million share, Clark County proposed raising sales and vehicle excise taxes by 0.3 percent, also requiring voter approval. On February 7, 1995, 69 percent of those who voted in Clark County rejected the proposed tax increases, halting the project. Planning for the South/North Corridor resumed later that year when TriMet released a revision that scaled back the line's northern half by eliminating its North Portland and Clark County segments up to the Rose Quarter. To fill the funding gap that resulted from the exclusion of Clark County, the Oregon House of Representatives passed a $750 million transportation package, including $375 million for the project. The Oregon Supreme Court promptly struck down this funding due to the inclusion of unrelated measures, which violated the state's constitution. In February 1996, state legislators revised the package, but light rail opponents forced a statewide vote in November that ultimately prevented the use of state funds.

In an effort to gain the support of North Portland residents, who had historically voted in favor of light rail, and to avoid seeking state funding, TriMet announced a third plan in February 1997 that proposed a  line from Lombard Street in North Portland to Clackamas Town Center. In August, due to the wording on the original ballot passed in 1994, which described the line extending into Clark County, the TriMet board decided to hold another vote on a new $475 million bond measure. Portland area residents cast their vote on November 3, 1998, and rejected it by 52 percent, effectively canceling the project. Despite the South/North project's cancellation, North Portland residents and city business leaders continued to push for light rail. In 1999, they urged TriMet to revive the northern portion of the South/North project, which led to the Interstate MAX and Yellow Line opening in 2004.

Revival and funding

In April 1999, JPACT revived plans for the I-205 and McLoughlin Boulevard corridors by announcing the $8.8 million South Corridor Transportation Study. The committee published the study's report in October 2000, narrowing a range of transit alternatives for each corridor; it outlined constructing either two light rail lines, a combination of one light rail line and one improved bus service, bus rapid transit, or dedicated bus lanes. After public meetings concluded in 2003, JPACT recommended both light rail options. They decided the first MAX line to Clackamas County should be built along the I-205 busway from Gateway to Clackamas Town Center, and that this would be the first of two phases, the second of which would be a Portland–Milwaukie line via McLoughlin Boulevard. While planning for the second phase,  alignment studies within downtown Portland showed that a fourth service along the existing tracks on Morrison and Yamhill streets, then served by the Blue, Red, and Yellow lines, would push that segment to maximum capacity. JPACT responded by amending the first phase to include adding light rail to the Portland Transit Mall. The first phase would be completed in 2009, with the transit mall rebuilt with light rail and the Yellow Line rerouted to it in August. The I-205 segment would open the following month with a new Green Line service.

In July 2008, Metro adopted a locally preferred alternative (LPA) route for the second-phased Portland–Milwaukie line that began at the southern end of the Portland Transit Mall and terminated at Southeast Park Avenue in Oak Grove, just south of Milwaukie proper in unincorporated Clackamas County; the alignment was extended beyond Southeast Lake Road in downtown Milwaukie, which had been the terminus in the 2003 LPA. The 2008 LPA also proposed a new bridge that would carry MAX and the Portland Streetcar over the Willamette River, in lieu of the Hawthorne Bridge, amid fears that the latter would create a traffic bottleneck. This new bridge had been proposed to run between RiverPlace on the west end and the Oregon Museum of Science and Industry (OMSI) on the east end, but the 2008 LPA introduced a new alternative that moved its west end farther south to the South Waterfront. The new bridge would accommodate only transit vehicles, bicycles, and pedestrians, and spanning , it would become the largest "car-free" bridge in the country upon completion. The project's final environmental impact statement was published in October 2010.

The Portland–Milwaukie Light Rail Project was budgeted at $1.49 billion, of which federal funding covered $745.2 million under the New Starts program. Despite TriMet's request for a 60-percent federal share, the Federal Transit Administration (FTA) only committed 50 percent, lower than any previous MAX project. Oregon provided the second-largest share at $355.2 million, mostly sourced from state lottery bond proceeds. Metro, TriMet, Clackamas County, Portland, Milwaukie, and in-kind property donations contributed $249.3 million to the remaining local-match funds. TriMet and the FTA entered into a funding agreement in May 2012. Clackamas County had originally agreed to allocate $25 million to the project but later negotiated a reduction to $22.6 million due to Measure 3-401, an anti-light rail initiative that light rail opponents placed on the ballot. The measure stipulated voter approval before officials could use county funds to finance, design, construct, or operate rail lines in the county. On September 18, 2012, Measure 3-401 passed with 60 percent of the vote. Afterwards, Clackamas County attempted to end its involvement with the project, appealing to TriMet to terminate the extension at Southeast Tacoma/Johnson Creek station, just north of the county line. TriMet filed a lawsuit, and in July 2013, a circuit court upheld the county's financial obligation and the project's continuation.

Construction and opening

On April 5, 2011, the FTA approved the start of the Portland–Milwaukie Light Rail Project's final design, which meant TriMet could begin purchasing rights-of-way and construction materials. Construction began on June 30, initially limited to the site of the new Willamette River crossing, which was temporarily named the "Portland–Milwaukie Light Rail Bridge". Utility relocation and other preparation work along the project route began later that year. By 2013, major light rail construction work had started in Clackamas County. Safety improvements were made at several street-level crossings in Southeast Portland and Milwaukie, allowing these areas to be designated quiet zones where freight and MAX trains do not have to use their horns when crossing an intersection. The project was halfway completed by July 2013. In April 2014, TriMet officially named the new bridge "Tilikum Crossing, Bridge of the People", which it selected from over 9,500 public submissions. The agency purchased 18 new Siemens S70 light rail vehicles, designated "Type 5"; the first car arrived in Portland that September. When construction finished the following year, the line was around $40 million under budget. A petition from Senator Jeff Merkley led the FTA to approve previously eliminated project elements such as switch heaters and additional station shelters, at a total cost of $3.6 million.

On May 15, 2015, the first public train ride, which carried 500 passengers including Governor Kate Brown and Senator Merkley, ran at regular operating speed along the entirety of the  Portland–Milwaukie extension. On August 30, test trains began running along the entire Orange Line route, ahead of the following month's opening date. The extension opened for service on September 12 at 11 am. The Orange Line became interlined with the Yellow Line when it took over service of the southbound 5th Avenue segment of the Portland Transit Mall. TriMet said separating the services would allow it to better control service frequencies from North Portland and Milwaukie to downtown Portland because it expected higher ridership of the Orange Line and that few riders from these communities would travel beyond the city center.

Route

The Orange Line serves the  Portland–Milwaukie extension. Orange Line service begins farther north of the Portland–Milwaukie segment at Union Station/Northwest 5th & Glisan station near Portland Union Station in downtown Portland, where southbound Yellow Line trains operate through into the Orange Line to serve the 5th Avenue segment of the Portland Transit Mall. Conversely, northbound Orange Line trains operate through into the Yellow Line to serve the 6th Avenue segment of the transit mall. Just south of the PSU South stations, the Portland-Milwaukie segment begins where tracks travel east along the median of Lincoln Street to a stop on 3rd Avenue. From here, the line continues east along Lincoln to an elevated viaduct after an intersection with Naito Parkway. The viaduct carries the line over Harbor Drive and River Parkway to the South Waterfront, where tracks merge with those of the Portland Streetcar's A and B Loop. The lines then cross the Willamette River on Tilikum Crossing.

On the opposite end of Tilikum Crossing in Southeast Portland, the streetcar tracks diverge near OMSI. The MAX tracks turn southeast and run parallel to the Union Pacific Railroad (UP). A stop is located near the intersection of Clinton Street and 12th Avenue. At 17th Avenue, the line turns south and runs along the median of 17th Avenue with stops at Holgate Boulevard and Rhine Street. It exits the median just north of McLoughlin Boulevard and continues parallel to this road, the Portland and Western Railroad, and UP through to Milwaukie, with stops at Bybee Boulevard and Tacoma Street. After a stop at Main Street in downtown Milwaukie, the line traverses the Kellogg Bridge across Kellogg Lake to 22nd Avenue. From here, the tracks leave the viaduct and again travel at-grade alongside McLoughlin Boulevard to a three-track stub terminal at Park Avenue in Oak Grove, just south of Milwaukie proper.

Stations

Ten stations were built as part of the Portland–Milwaukie Light Rail Project, from Lincoln Street/Southwest 3rd Avenue to Southeast Park Avenue. The Orange Line serves the stations along the Portland–Milwaukie segment, as well as the seven stations along the southbound 5th Avenue segment of the Portland Transit Mall in downtown Portland, where it interlines with the Green Line. Transfers to the Yellow Line, which runs northbound from PSU South station to Expo Center station in North Portland, can be made at any of the seven stations along the transit mall's 6th Avenue segment, although most northbound Orange Line trains operate through to the Yellow Line. 

Riders can transfer to the Blue and Red lines by detraining at Pioneer Place/Southwest 5th station and boarding at the Pioneer Square stations one block west. The Orange Line also connects to Amtrak at Union Station/Northwest 5th & Glisan station; to the Portland Streetcar at the PSU Urban Center/Southwest 5th & Mill and OMSI/Southeast Water stations; and to Frequent Express (FX), local, and intercity bus services at several stops.

In 2015, as part of a future pilot program to test the Hop Fastpass automated fare collection system, TriMet proposed installing turnstiles through which passengers would access paid fare zones within the Southeast Bybee Boulevard and Southeast Park Avenue stations. , these plans have not been enacted. Many stations along the Orange Line have public artwork, commissioned as part of TriMet's public art program.

Service

, the Orange Line operates for approximately 20 hours per day. On weekdays, the first train arrives as a southbound service at Union Station/Northwest 5th & Glisan station at 5:02 am. The first northbound train departs Southeast Park Avenue station at 6:14 am. End-to-end travel takes approximately 35 minutes. During peak hours, some Orange Line trains do not become Yellow Line trains; they loop back along the Transit Mall and return to Milwaukie. This is due to higher projected ridership along the Orange Line than the Yellow Line. The last Milwaukie-bound train departs Union Station/Northwest 5th & Glisan station at 12:02 am and the last Portland City Center-bound train departs Southeast Park Avenue station at 12:56 am. Service shifts slightly to an earlier schedule on weekends. TriMet designates the Orange Line as a "Frequent Service" route, running on a headway of 15 minutes during most of the day. Service is less frequent in the early mornings and late evenings, with headways of up to 30 minutes. In the late evenings, the Orange Line is supplemented by TriMet bus route 291–Orange Night Bus, which runs south from downtown Portland to Milwaukie following the Orange Line route. Two trips run on weekdays and one trip runs on Saturdays and Sundays.

Ridership

The Orange Line is the least-busy MAX service. Due to the COVID-19 pandemic, service averaged 3,480 riders on weekdays in September 2020, down from 11,500 for the same month in 2019. Forecasts that were used to help justify federal funding for the project predicted an average of 17,000 weekday trips in 2016 but by October of that year, the Orange Line was averaging fewer than 11,000 passengers.

Explanatory notes

References

External links

 
 
 

 
2015 establishments in Oregon
Orange Line
Rail lines in Oregon
Railway lines opened in 2015